The 2020 Nobel Prize in Literature was awarded to the American poet Louise Glück (born 1943) who the Swedish Academy members praised "for her unmistakable poetic voice that with austere beauty makes individual existence universal." The winner was announced on October 8, 2020, by Mats Malm, permanent secretary of the Swedish Academy. She is the 13th Nobel laureate in Literature from the United States after 2016 laureate Bob Dylan and 1993 laureate Toni Morrison.

Laureate

Louise Glück is an American poet and essayist known for her autobiographical poems of intense emotions and drawing mythological and natural imageries in understanding personal life and experiences. Among the recurring themes in her collections are about childhood, family life, relationships and death. In addition to classical mythology, the rich English-language poetry tradition is her primary literary source of inspiration. Her language is characterized by clarity and precision and is free of poetic formalities. A United States Poet Laureate, she has garnered numerous literary prizes such as the Pulitzer Prize, National Book Award, and the Bollingen Prize. Among her celebrated poem collections are The Triumph of Achilles (1985), The Wild Iris (1992), Averno (2006), and Faithful and Virtuous Night (2014).

Reactions

Personal reactions
In a short interview conducted by Adam Smith,  Chief Scientific Officer of Nobel Media, in the early hours of Thursday morning, Glück was asked what the award would mean to her. She responded saying: 

Following the announcement, Glück found herself in an uncomfortable, "nightmarish" situation due to the endless phone calls that "hadn't stopped ringing since 7:00 am" and where journalists lining up outside her residence in Cambridge, Massachusetts. Asked by New York Times as to how did she feel once she absorbed that her win was real, she said:

International reactions

The chair of the Nobel prize committee, Anders Olsson hailed Glück's "candid and uncompromising" voice, which is full of humour and biting wit. Her 12 collections of poetry, including her most recent Faithful and Virtuous Night, the Pulitzer-winning The Wild Iris, and the Averno, are characterised by a striving for clarity", he added, comparing her to Emily Dickinson with "her severity and unwillingness to accept simple tenets of faith".

Fellow poet Claudia Rankine told The Guardian that she was so pleased that it was conferred to her. "Something good had to happen!" Rankine said. "She is a tremendous poet, a great mentor, and a wonderful friend. I couldn't be happier. We are in a bleak moment in this country, and as we poets continue to imagine our way forward, Louise has spent a lifetime showing us how to make language both mean something and hold everything." Deccan Herald described her "an underwhelming choice for the Nobel Prize" because of the confronting reality that there were other writers who deserved it more. Furthermore, they expressed: "Though Glück is a much-admired poet, she is not very well-known."

Jonathan Galassi, president of Farrar, Straus and Giroux, told Reuters he was certain the Nobel prize would bring Gluck "to many, many new reader." He described her as "one of the rare contemporary poets whose work has the gift of speaking directly to readers through her great and subtle art." Yale president Peter Salovey congratulated, saying: "Yale celebrates a poet of the interior life, whose unsparing explorations of the self and its place in the world in volume after volume have created poems of beauty and revelation. We also honor a galvanizing teacher who has given herself unstintingly to students, who revere her."

Award ceremony

Nobel lecture
In her Nobel lecture, which was delivered in writing, she highlighted her early engagement with poetry by William Blake, Stephen Foster and Emily Dickinson in discussing the relationship between poets, readers, and the wider public, also minimally citing T. S. Eliot and William Shakespeare. She concluded her lecture, saying:

'Minstrel Show' controversy

Immediately after her lecture was made available, numerous literary critics and fellow poets described it as "disastrously bad" and "refines racism." Her invocation of Blake's "The Little Black Boy" (written by a white abolitionist in the voice of a Black boy who was enslaved) and Stephen Foster's "Swanee River" (a song by a writer whose work was a staple of minstrel shows) was questioned by many on Twitter. Many noted that Glück, even if she meant to make a timely point about racism, might have used the words of an actual person of color, and not the caricature of a Black person as imagined by a white man.

Matt Sandler, author of The Black Romantic Revolution: Abolitionist Poets at the End of Slavery, commented on the Nobel lecture, saying: 

American poet Mary Karr for whom Glück served as a thesis adviser expressed disappointment, saying: "At this point in history, Louise Glück – my grad thesis advisor [and] a poet I deeply admire – wrote a minstrel show Nobel speech. In 1789, Blake's 'Black Boy' might have passed as 'abolitionist', but it came out of a shoe-polished white face. Wake TF up." Poet Li Yin Alvarado reacted in Twitter, saying: "elevating a poem — however abolitionist in intent — that is rooted in upholding white supremacy, understandably, I think, turns off readers for whom fighting against said supremacy is a not some literary or intellectual exercise, but an actual matter of survival." 

Activist and author Faylita Hicks expressed: "There was no reason to speak about the "little Black boy" conjured up by the mind of Blake. Any other poem could have stood in. It is violence when one chooses, still, to recommend and elevate a white man's caricature over any other Black man or women's genius." American writer Alissa Quart compared Glück with the controversial 2019 Nobel laureate Peter Handke through a Twitter post: "Louise Gluck follows Peter Handke as really wrong Nobel prize winners in literature. Why not Susan Howe, Anne Carson, Erica Hunt, Nathaniel Mackey, [or] Jorie Graham? Gluck and the vacuity of apolitical poetry of status quo leads directly to minstrelsy. No coincidence."

Prize presentation
During the award ceremony held on December 10, 2020, Prof. Anders Olsson delivered the following statement about Glück:   

Due to the restrictions by the COVID-19 pandemic, the annual Nobel banquet was postponed, however, Glück still received her medal, diploma and monetary prize from the Swedish Academy at her residence in New York City.

Nobel Committee
The Swedish Academy's Nobel Committee for the 2020 Nobel Prize in Literature were the following members:

References

External links
Price announcement nobelprize.org
Award Ceremony speech nobelprize.org
Nobel lecture nobelprize.org

2020
2020 awards